The Last Supper (1983), by American author Charles McCarry, is the fourth novel in the Paul Christopher series.

Plot 

The Last Supper fills a great deal of back story to the Paul Christopher saga.  The first part of the novel details Christopher's parents' courtship and marriage in pre-World War II Germany, Christopher's childhood, and the mystery surrounding his mother's disappearance.  The second part of the novel picks up right after The Tears of Autumn, with Christopher being imprisoned in China for espionage.

References 

 The Last Supper, Signet, 1983

1983 American novels